Miguel Ángel Albizures (born 1944) is a Guatelamalan human rights activist and newspaper columnist. He is the spokesperson for the Center for Human Rights Legal Action (CALDH) in Guatemala City. He has been the target of frequent death threats.

Albizures has held various leadership positions in Guatemalan human rights and labor organizations, including Director of Guatemala's Democratic Front Against Repression (FDCR), Director of the National Committee for Trade Union Unity (CNUS), and Secretary General of the National Worker's Central (CNT). he also served as the President of the Association of Relatives of the Detained and Disappeared of Guatemala (FAMDEGUA).

References 

1944 births
Guatemalan human rights activists
Living people
Nonviolence advocates
Guatemalan trade union leaders